Marrow 2 is the fourth EP of the Illinois-based industrial band, I:Scintilla, and the second in their Marrow series. "Drag Along" is a reworked version of a song previously on the acoustic album Marrow 1.

The artwork was illustrated by singer Brittany Bindrim.

Track listing 
 "Ruin" - 04:09
 "Skin Tight" - 03:41
 "Sequins & Pills" - 03:43
 "Drag Along" - 04:49
 "Skin Tight (Bounte Mix)" - 03:13
 "Skin Tight (Hardwire Mix))" - 03:58
 "Sequins & Pills (Cellhavoc Mix)" - 04:00
 "Ruin (Acidrodent Mix)" - 06:29

References 

I:Scintilla albums
2012 EPs